Disks large-associated protein 2 is a protein that in humans is encoded by the DLGAP2 gene.

Function 

The product of this gene is one of the membrane-associated guanylate kinases localized at postsynaptic density in neuronal cells. These kinases are a family of signaling molecules expressed at various submembrane domains and contain the PDZ, SH3 and the guanylate kinase domains. This protein may play a role in the molecular organization of synapses and in neuronal cell signaling. Alternatively spliced transcript variants encoding different isoforms have been identified, but their full-length nature is not known.

Interactions 

DLGAP2 has been shown to interact with DLG4, the canonical synapse marker protein, which in turn binds to N-Methyl-d-aspartate (NMDA) receptors and Shaker-type K+ channels.

Clinical significance 

As with many other synaptic genes, including its binding partner Shank2, DLGAP2 has been shown to be associated with Autism.

References

Further reading